William Stranchon McKinnon (December 19, 1852 – November 17, 1908) was a Republican politician in the U.S. state of Ohio who was Speaker of the Ohio House and Ohio State Treasurer from 1904 to 1908.

Biography

William S. McKinnon was born at Owen Sound, Ontario, Canada. He was moved to Cleveland, where he grew up, and became a machinist.

McKinnon relocated to Ashtabula, where he owned machine shops, was a member of the Board of Education and city council and was Mayor of Ashtabula. He married Octavia J. Porter on April 2, 1878, and had four sons and one daughter. In 1880, he was the founder and head of the McKinnon Iron Works Company at Ashtabula Harbor.

McKinnon was elected to the Ohio House of Representatives in 1897 and served in the 73rd, 74th, and 75th General Assemblies, 1898–1903. In the 75th General Assembly (1902–1903), he was chosen Speaker of the House.

In May 1900, McKinnon was appointed an Ohio Commissioner of the Pan-American Exposition

In 1903, the Republicans nominated McKinnon for Ohio State Treasurer, and he won the election that year, and again in 1905. Elections were moved to even-numbered years, and McKinnon chose not to run in 1908. His term would have ended in January 1909, but he died at his Ashtabula home on November 17, 1908.

Notes

References

State treasurers of Ohio
Politicians from Ashtabula, Ohio
1852 births
1908 deaths
Speakers of the Ohio House of Representatives
Republican Party members of the Ohio House of Representatives
Mayors of places in Ohio
People from Owen Sound
19th-century American politicians